The Norman B. Streeter Homestead, on Streeter Ranch, in rural Custer County, South Dakota, near Beaver Creek, also near to Buffalo Gap, South Dakota, dates from 1889. It was listed on the National Register of Historic Places in 1995.

References

		
Ranches on the National Register of Historic Places in South Dakota
National Register of Historic Places in Custer County, South Dakota
Late 19th and Early 20th Century American Movements architecture
Buildings and structures completed in 1889